Charax was an ancient place of the Cadusii people, in Cadusia, Media Atropatene on the Caspian Sea, north of Cyropolis.

References

Former populated places in Iran
Cadusii
History of Talysh
History of Gilan
Atropatene